Tetragonoderus discopunctatus is a species of beetle in the family Carabidae. It was described by Maximilien Chaudoir in 1850.

References

discopunctatus
Beetles described in 1850